Kiennast or Handelshaus Julius Kiennast is a company group based in Lower Austria, working in areas of food retail and wholesale, and also in delivery to restaurants and petrol station shops. The company history started in 1585 and is one of the oldest still active trading houses in Austria.

History 
The company headquarters in Gars am Kamp was mentioned in a business document in 1585, and Mathias Kiennast took the shop in 1710. In 1910 was installed a gasoline pump, the fuel supplier was Shell since 1925. From 1956 the wholesale trade was taken over the merchants' organization A&O, which later became firm Nah&Frisch. In the middle of the 1990s started the supply of the Austrian storage houses RWA. The restructuring in 1998 created the current form of the company. The 2010 celebration was under the title: 300 years of company Kiennast with the tradition of 425 years of trade house.

See also 
List of oldest companies

References 
Article contains translated text from Julius Kiennast on the German Wikipedia retrieved on 25 February 2017.

External links 
Homepage
Facebook page

Wholesalers of Austria
Companies established in the 16th century
Establishments in the Archduchy of Austria
Economy of Lower Austria